There are 17 national parks in Tunisia.

National parks
Bou-Hedma National Park
Boukornine National Park
Chambi National Park
Dghoumes National Park
El Feidja National Park
Ichkeul National Park
Jebel Chitana-Cap Négro National Park
Jebel Mghilla National Park
Jebel Orbata National Park
Jebel Serj National Park
Jebel Zaghdoud National Park
Jebel Zaghouan National Park
Jebil National Park
Oued Zeen National Park
Sanghr Jabbess National Park
Sidi Toui National Park
Zembra National Park

See also
 List of national parks
 List of national parks in Africa

References

Tunisia
 
National parks
National parks